Tommy Yule (born 27 January 1953) is a Scottish former professional footballer who played as a winger.

Career
Born in Glasgow, Yule played for Beith, Arbroath and Airdrie.

References

1953 births
Living people
Scottish footballers
Beith F.C. players
Arbroath F.C. players
Airdrieonians F.C. (1878) players
Scottish Football League players
Association football wingers